Giuseppe de Majo (di Maio; 5 December 169718 November 1771) was an Italian composer and organist. He was the father of the composer Gian Francesco de Majo. His compositional output consists of 10 operas, an oratorio, a concerto for 2 violins, and a considerable amount of sacred music.

Life and career
Born in Naples, Majo spent most of his life working in his native city. He began his studies at the age of 9 at the Conservatorio della Pietà dei Turchini where he was a pupil of Nicola Fago and Andrea Basso. His first opera, Lo finto laccheo, premiered in 1725 at the Teatro dei Fiorentini.

Majo was appointed organista soprannumerario at the Royal chapel of Naples in May 1736. There he flourished, largely due to the favoritism given to him by Queen Maria Amalia. In 1744 he succeeded Leonardo Leo as maestro di cappella at the Royal chapel. He remained in that post through 1770. He died in Naples in 1771.

Recording
1 concerto in Neapolitan Flute Concertos, Auser Musici, Carlo Ipata, director, Hyperion CDA67784 (2010)

References

1697 births
1771 deaths
Italian Baroque composers
Italian male classical composers
Italian opera composers
Male opera composers
Musicians from Naples
18th-century Italian composers
18th-century Italian male musicians
Pupils of Giovanni Battista Martini